Macintosh II Repair and Upgrade Secrets is a 264-page hardcover do-it-yourself book written by Larry Pina that describes how to repair and upgrade a Macintosh II personal computer. The book was first published in 1991 and is now out of print. It came with a diskette.

See also
 Larry Pina

Computer books
Macintosh internals
Books by Larry Pina